Guy Branum (born November 12, 1975) is an American comedian, writer, and actor best known as the head writer of, and a sketch performer on, X-Play on the G4 network and as a regular panelist on Chelsea Lately on the E! network. He used to host the podcast Pop Rocket on the Maximum Fun network, and hosted TruTV's Talk Show the Game Show.

Early life
Branum was born and raised in Yuba City, California to a Protestant father and Jewish mother. He attended the University of California, Berkeley from 1994-1998 where he was a history and political science major. He wrote a column for the Daily Californian, one of which brought the United States Secret Service to his apartment in November 1997 before the Big Game between Berkeley and Stanford University, in which the Associated Press misquoted parts of his article, suggesting that he made suggestions that Berkeley students murder Stanford freshman Chelsea Clinton.

He then moved to Minnesota, where he attended the University of Minnesota Law School, and was on the school's Quiz Bowl team that placed third at CBI nationals in 1999. During his time in law school he publicly came out as gay. After graduating, he returned to California.

Career 
After being recommended by co-hostess Laura Swisher, Branum was hired as a writer for Unscrewed with Martin Sargent while it was still on TechTV in San Francisco. On Unscrewed, he regularly appeared as a sweater model and as The Ambassador of Gay. He was also a writer and producer on G4tv.com, and head writer on the G4 channel program X-Play. He also contributed to the comedy podcast Weezy and the Swish. In December 2007, Branum became a writer and an onscreen comedy performer on Chelsea Lately. He made his feature film debut in January 2011 in No Strings Attached. In 2012 Branum became a writer for the show Totally Biased with W. Kamau Bell, performing a recurring segment "No more Mr. Nice Gay." He appeared on the eighth season of Last Comic Standing. In 2017, Branum performed at the inaugural Portland Queer Comedy Festival.

He was the host and executive producer of Talk Show The Game Show on TruTV, which was canceled in November 2018.

He was the regular host of Pop Rocket, a podcast that dissects popular culture, on the Maximum Fun network, which was cancelled in May 2019.

His book My Life As A Goddess: A Memoir Through (Un)Popular Culture was published in 2018 with a foreword by Mindy Kaling.

Branum released his first comedy album, Effable, in 2015 on ASpecialThing Records.

References

External links
  
 
 G4tv interview
  Profile on WNYC-FM

1975 births
Living people
American male comedians
American male television writers
American stand-up comedians
People from Yuba City, California
TechTV people
UC Berkeley College of Letters and Science alumni
University of Minnesota Law School alumni
X-Play
American male television actors
Male actors from California
21st-century American male actors
American gay actors
American gay writers
People from Marysville, California
Comedians from California
Screenwriters from California
21st-century American comedians
21st-century American screenwriters
21st-century American male writers